Qissa Khwani Bazaar bombing took place in the Qissa Khwani Bazaar market in Peshawar, Pakistan on 29 September 2013 killing at least 41 people and another 100 were injured.

Attack
The attack took place when the car bomb detonated about 11 a.m. (local time) on 29 September 2013 in the crowded market. 41 people were killed in this incident, 16 of whom were members of the same family. The attack happened 2 days after 19 government employees were killed in a bus bombing in the same city on 27 September 2013 (Friday).

See also
Qissa Khwani Bazaar massacre
Peshawar church attack

References

2013 murders in Pakistan
21st-century mass murder in Pakistan
Mass murder in 2013
Terrorist incidents in Pakistan in 2013
Suicide bombings in Pakistan
History of Peshawar
Massacres in Pakistan
Terrorist incidents in Peshawar
September 2013 events in Pakistan
Attacks on buildings and structures in Pakistan
Marketplace attacks in Asia